Kepler-60d is a planet discovered in 2012 that orbits the star Kepler-60. It was found by the Kepler Mission using the transit method.

References

Exoplanets discovered in 2012
Exoplanets discovered by the Kepler space telescope

Lyra (constellation)